The Rybushka Formation is a Campanian geologic formation in the Penza and Saratov Oblasts of European Russia. Pterosaur, fish and invertebrate fossils have been recovered from the formation.

Fossil content 
The following fossils have been reported from the formation:

 Amylodon karamysh
 Archaeolamna kopingensis
 Bogolubovia orientalis
 Cretolamna appendiculata
 Ischyodus bifurcatus
 Volgadraco bogolubovi
 Pseudocorax laevis
 Squalicorax kaupi
 Squatina hasei
 Chalmys sp.
 Edaphodon sp.
 Elasmodus sp.
 Eostriatolamia sp.
 Gryphaeostrea sp.
 Heterodontus sp.
 Monticulina sp.
 Prognathodon sp.
 Solariella sp.
 Squatirhina sp.
 ?Clidastes sp.
 Chelospharginae indet.
 Elasmobranchii indet.
 Elasmosauridae indet.
 Enchodontidae indet.
 Mosasauridae indet.
 Plesiosauria indet.
 Polycotylidae indet.
 Testudinata indet.
 ?Thoracosaurinae indet.

See also 
 List of pterosaur-bearing stratigraphic units

References

Further reading 
 M. S. Arkhangelsky, A. O. Averianov, and E. M. Pervushov. 2007. Short-necked plesiosaurs of the Family Polycotylidae from the Campanian of the Saratov Region. Paleontological Journal 41(6):656-660
 A. V. Averianov and E. V. Popov. 2014. A pterosaurian vertebra from the Upper Cretaceous of the Saratov Region. Paleontological Journal 48(3):326-329
 A. O. Averianov, M. S. Arkhangelsky, and E. M. Pervushov. 2008. A new Late Cretaceous azhdarchid (Pterosauria, Azhdarchidae) from the Volga region. Paleontological Journal 42(6):634-642
 A. O. Averianov. 2007. New records of azhdarchids (Pterosauria, Azhdarchidae) from the Late Cretaceous of Russia, Kazakhstan, and Central Asia. Paleontological Journal 41(2):189-197
 N. N. Bogoliubow. 1914. O ozvonkye pterodaktilya iz verkhnemelovykh otlozheniy Saratovskoy gubernii [A pterodactyl vertebra from the Upper Cretaceous deposits of Saratov province]. Ezhegodnikie po Geologii i Mineralogii Rossii/Annuaire Géologique et Minéralogique de la Russie 16(1):1-7

Geologic formations of Russia
Upper Cretaceous Series of Europe
Cretaceous Russia
Campanian Stage
Sandstone formations
Phosphorite formations
Shallow marine deposits
Paleontology in Russia